Aaron Lindström (born 20 July 2000) is a Swedish male paralympic alpine skier, competing at the slalom, giant slalom and super-G events at the 2018 Winter Paralympics.

References

External links 
 Profile at paralympics.se 

2000 births
Living people
Swedish male alpine skiers
Paralympic alpine skiers of Sweden
2018 Winter Paralympians of Sweden
Alpine skiers at the 2018 Winter Paralympics
Alpine skiers at the 2022 Winter Paralympics
21st-century Swedish people